1400 series may refer to:

 Kintetsu 1400 series electric multiple unit operating for Kintetsu Railway
 IBM 1400 series computers produced by IBM